The Manawatu Sires Produce Stakes is a Group One horse race held for Thoroughbred two-year-olds at Awapuni Racecourse in Palmerston North, New Zealand.

Run over 1400 metres in late March or early April it, and the Ellerslie Sires Produce Stakes (1200m), are regarded as New Zealand's best two-year-old races.

It is currently raced on the same day as the:

 Group 2 Awapuni Gold Cup over 2000m for open class horses.
 Group 3 Manawatu Classic over 2000m for 3YO horses.
 Listed Flying Handicap over 1400m for Open Handicap runners.
 
The race was first run in 1908 over 1200 metres with the current distance being adopted in 1926.

Results Since 1969

Earlier Winners

1968　- Mayo Gold
1967　- Mannix
1966　- Raidan
1965　- Jetmate
1964　- Rio
1963　- Gold Chat
1962　- Blyton
1961　- Cabriere
1960　- Marengo
1959　- Gayfair
1958　- Up and Coming
1957　- Miss Able
1956　- Passive
1955　- Romanos
1954　- Royal Applause
1953　- Timanah
1952　- Flying Queen
1951　- Taringaroa
1950　- The Unicorn
1949　- Gold Script
1948　- Joyful Lady
1947　- Great Trek
1946　- Robin's Reward
1945　- Royal Raider
1944　- Subdued
1943　- Virtuoso
1942　- Nizam
1941　- Premature
1940　- Phaleron
1939　- Submission
1938　- Defaulter
1937　- Smoke Screen
1936　- Custos
1935　- Legatee
1934　- Burnish
1933　- Golden Hair
1932　- Midinette
1931　- High Comedy
1930　- Gesture
1929　- Gay Ballerina
1928　- Episode
1927　- Thaw
1926　- Limerick
1925　- Lady Cavendish
1924　- Motley
1923　- Tukia
1922　- The Dunce
1921　- Absurdum
1920　- Little River
1919　- Warplane
1918　- Finmark
1917　- Estland
1916　- Hyttus
1915　- Desert Gold
1914　- Charmilla
1913　- Rinaldo
1912　- Ermengarde
1911　- Peirene
1910　- no race
1909　- Polymorphous
1908　- Maori King

See also 

 Thoroughbred racing in New Zealand
 Awapuni Gold Cup
 Karaka Million
 New Zealand Derby

References

Horse races in New Zealand